Syarhey Ignatovich (born 29 June 1992) is a Belarusian professional football player currently playing for Shakhtyor Soligorsk.

Honours
Dinamo Brest
Belarusian Super Cup winner: 2020

Shakhtyor Soligorsk
Belarusian Super Cup winner: 2023

References

External links
 
 
 Profile at Dinamo Minsk website

1992 births
Living people
People from Mogilev
Sportspeople from Mogilev Region
Belarusian footballers
Association football goalkeepers
Belarus international footballers
FC Dinamo Minsk players
FC Bereza-2010 players
FC Dynamo Brest players
FC Minsk players
FC Isloch Minsk Raion players
FC Shakhtyor Soligorsk players